Astronomia may refer to:

Astronomia (poem), an Ancient Greek poem
"Astronomia" (song), a 2010 electronic dance track by Tony Igy
 "Astronomia" (Vicetone remix), a 2014 remix of the track by Vicetone
1154 Astronomia, an asteroid
Astronomia.pl, a Polish website
Astronomia nova, a 1609 book by German astronomer Johannes Kepler